Archimonocelididae is a family of flatworms belonging to the order Proseriata.

Genera:
 Archimonocelis Meixner, 1938 
 Dreuxiola Schockaert, Curini-Galletti, De Ridder, Volonterio & Artois, 2009 
 Meidiama Marcus, 1946

References

Platyhelminthes